The martyrs of Vilnius may refer to:

Anthony, John, and Eustathios, three Orthodox monks murdered in Vilnius (possibly in 1347)
Franciscan martyrs of Vilnius, 14 Catholic monks murdered in Vilnius (possibly around 1369)